Rudolph I (859 – October 25, 911) was King of Upper Burgundy from his election in 888 until his death.

Rudolph belonged to the elder Welf family and was the son of Conrad, Count of Auxerre and Waldrada of Worms. From his father he inherited the lay abbacy of St Maurice en Valais, making him the most powerful magnate in Upper Burgundy - present-day western Switzerland and the Franche-Comté.

After the deposition and death of Charles the Fat in 888, the nobles and leading clergy of Upper Burgundy met at St Maurice and elected Rudolph as king. Apparently on the basis of this election, Rudolph claimed the whole of Lotharingia, taking much of modern Lorraine and Alsace - but his claim was contested by Arnulf of Carinthia, the new king of East Francia, who rapidly forced Rudolph to abandon Lotharingia in return for recognition as king of Burgundy. However, hostilities between Rudolph and Arnulf seem to have continued intermittently until 894.

Rudolph's relationships with his other neighbours were friendlier. His sister Adelaide married Richard the Justiciar, duke of Burgundy (the present day Burgundy, part of west Francia). He had at least four children:
 Rudolph II, King of Burgundy
 Adelaide, married Louis the Blind of Provence (Lower Burgundy),
 Willa married Boso of Tuscany,
 Waldrada married Boniface I, of Spoleto.

Rudolph was succeeded as king of Burgundy by his son, Rudolph II. Rudolf I's widow, queen Guilla, married Hugh of Arles in 912.

This Rudolph is frequently confused with his nephew Rudolph of France, who was the second duke of Burgundy and ninth king of France.

References

Sources

Elder House of Welf
859 births
912 deaths
Kings of Burgundy
10th-century rulers in Europe
9th-century rulers in Europe